Government Livestock Farm, Hisar, Asia's largest livestock breeding, research and training institute, is a public funded institute located at Hisar of Haryana state in India.

History
After Hisar was depopulated in Chalisa famine (1783–84 CE), the farm was set up in 1809 by Major James Lumsdaine during British Raj as a private camel stud to supply camels to army, taken over by the British East India Company (EIC) in 1901. Its original name The Camel Stud under Commissariat Department was changed to Ordnance Cattle Farm under Studd Department in 1854, Government Cattle Farm in 1912 and to The Government Livestock Farm in 1945 while other animals were included such as buffaloes, cattle, horses, sheep, goat and swine. Originally farm had 40,000 acre land including "Bir Hisar" area, of which 80% had been transferred to other departments, leaving only 7842 acres with the farm in 2010, of which 5443 acres is in cultivation. Further, more than 3000 acres have been transferred to Hisar Airport, leaving about 4,000 acres with the farm.

Hisar farm was used to breed and cross-breed camels, bovine (ox) and studs (horses) to improve the breed and supply to the British Indian Army to reduce reliance on the Banjara suppliers who supplied bovine to both British and their adversaries. The farm regularly and exclusively supplied animals to Bengal Presidency, as well as to the Northern Circars, Nagpur and Burma (during First Anglo-Burmese War) on occasional needs basis. Since 1801, EIC started to attach camels to the Native Cavalry units. By 1808, there were fixed establishments of camels at Agra, Kanpur, Mathura, Saharanpur and Meerut, operated by Major James Lumsdaine who was the officially appointed supplier agent for the camels and gram (main feed for horses) since 1807 and he simultaneously held a high position of Deputy Commissary General of Camel and Cattle branch of Commissariat Department from 1810 onward. James maintained both roles until his death in September 1816. Commissariat Department was already breeding camels at Hisar since 1809 and the breeding of Bovine at Hisar commenced in 1814 for direct induction into military. After Major James Lumsdaine's death, his younger brother Lt. William Lumsdaine was appointed in the dual roles in his place around 1815–16. An 1822 plan to breed Merino sheep and rams was shelved.  William was replaced by Capt. H.E. Peach in 1824–25 who expanded the farm by purchasing land from the nearby villages. He was replaced by Capt. From 1824, the farm started to distribute a fixed number of bovine to zamindars within 10 kos of farm to improve the breed. J.D. Parsons in 1926 who remained in office until 1837. An 1830 suggestion of Governors General Lord William Bentinck to close down the farm was not implemented and in 1833 the attempts to cross-breed Mysore breed with native cattle were abandoned due to disappointing results. In 1933 disused Western Yamuna Canal was repaired, a water channel from its Hansi branch was dug to a pond in the farm, which resulted in area and crop cultivation to be used for the farm animals. This also resulted in the increase in the population of people in the nearby villages due to increased cropping. During the early years, since the farm was dependent on the rain only the cattle were moved to other areas to north and northeast (as far as 260 km to Doon Valley) during fodder famine in 1833–34, 1837–38, 1841–42 and 1844. Captain Hailes from 1837 to 1841 and Captain Dickey from 1841 to 1854 were in charge. In 1843, Hisar city had a population 7,000 people and farm had 2000 camels and 9000 cattle.

In 2015, the Government of Haryana signed an MoU with Israel to set up the Indo-Israeli Centre of Excellence for Animal Husbandry & Dairying, Hisar at Government Livestock Farm, Hisar. Among others, the farm breeds Hariana breed and imported breeds for adoption to the local conditions.

See also 
 List of institutions of higher education in Haryana
 List of Universities and Colleges in Hisar
 List of think tanks in India

References

External links 
 
 "Detailed history of Livestock farm" , by Biran P Caton, 17-pages long pdf.

Research institutes in Hisar (city)
Agricultural universities and colleges in Haryana
Universities and colleges in Hisar (city)
Agriculture in Haryana
1809 establishments in India
Research institutes established in 1809